Dizzy Atmosphere is an album featuring members of Dizzy Gillespie's Orchestra including trombonist Al Grey, saxophonist Billy Mitchell and trumpeter Lee Morgan recorded in 1957 and released on the Specialty label.

Reception 

The Allmusic review by Scott Yanow stated "the music is modern bop for the period. Highlights include the ten-and-a-half-minute "Dishwater," "Over the Rainbow," and an early version of Golson's "Whisper Not." Morgan plays extremely well throughout the spirited set, and he was just 18 at the time".

Track listing 
All compositions by Roger Spotts except where noted.
 "Dishwater" – 12:05
 "Someone I Know" – 3:59
 "D.D.T." – 4:04
 "Whisper Not" (Benny Golson) – 5:55
 "About Time" – 3:14
 "Day by Day" (Axel Stordahl, Paul Weston, Sammy Cahn) – 3:26
 "Rite of Swing" – 3:14
 "Over the Rainbow" (Harold Arlen, Yip Harburg) – 4:18
 "Someone I Know" [take 3 – alternate] – 4:07 Bonus track on CD reissue
 "Whisper Not" [take 3–4 – alternate] (Golson) – 6:01 Bonus track on CD reissue
 "Over the Rainbow" [take 3 – alternate] (Arlen, Harburg) – 4:34 Bonus track on CD reissue

Personnel 
Lee Morgan – trumpet
Al Grey – trombone
Billy Mitchell – tenor saxophone
Billy Root – baritone saxophone
Wynton Kelly- piano
Paul West – bass
Charlie Persip – drums
Benny Golson (tracks 4, 6 & 10), Roger Spotts (tracks 1–3, 5, 7–9 & 11) – arranger

References 

1957 albums
Al Grey albums
Billy Mitchell (jazz musician) albums
Lee Morgan albums
Specialty Records albums
Albums arranged by Benny Golson